Ginette Gamatis is a member of the National Assembly of Seychelles.  A teacher by profession, she is a member of the Seychelles People's Progressive Front, and was first elected to the Assembly in 1993.

References
Member page on Assembly website

Year of birth missing (living people)
Living people
Members of the National Assembly (Seychelles)
People from Port Glaud
United Seychelles Party politicians
Seychellois women in politics
21st-century women politicians
20th-century women politicians